Frances Sevilla Cleveland Axtell (June 12, 1866 – May 27, 1953) was one of the first female legislators in the United States of America, elected to the Washington House of Representatives in 1912.

Early life

Cleveland was born to William and Mary Cleveland on June 12, 1866. From Sterling, Illinois, Cleveland's father was a farmer and stock-raiser.

Personal life

Cleveland married Dr. William Axtell on June 11, 1891. The couple had two daughters, Ruth Axtell (born September 28, 1892) and Helen Frances Axtell (born July 23, 1901). Axtell earned a PhD at DePauw University, where she was a member of Kappa Alpha Theta, before moving to Bellingham, Washington.

Career
Running on the Republican ticket, Axtell was elected to the 54th District of the Washington House of Representatives representing Bellingham in 1912. She was an advocate for a minimum-wage, the banning of child labor, workers' compensation, and pensions for the elderly, disabled, and widows. She also helped change aspects of criminal law, especially violent assault. She nearly became a U.S. Senator in 1916 losing by about three thousand votes. Her relationship with her brother Frederick Cleveland, who worked in the administration of President William Howard Taft, coupled with the publicity surrounding her 1916 attempt as a senator, brought her to the attention of President Woodrow Wilson. On January 5, 1917, President Wilson appointed her to the Federal Employees' Compensation Commission.

Death
Frances Axtell died on May 27, 1953 in Seattle.

References

External links 
 http://www.historylink.org/index.cfm?DisplayPage=output.cfm&file_id=9625
 (National Women's History Museum – Women Wielding Power: Pioneer Female State Legislators)
 http://www.kappaalphatheta.org/learnabouttheta/whatistheta/notable_thetas.cfm?notableThetaId=44
 http://www.kappaalphatheta.org/iamatheta/notablethetas/index.cfm
 (Full text: "Minimum Wage Board. Wednesday, April 17, 1918)
 
 http://chroniclingamerica.loc.gov/lccn/sn83045211/1918-05-02/ed-1/seq-20/;words=Axtell

1866 births
1953 deaths
Women in Washington (state) politics
DePaul University alumni
19th-century American women politicians
19th-century American politicians
20th-century American women politicians
20th-century American politicians
History of women in Washington (state)
People from Sterling, Illinois
Women state legislators in Washington (state)